"A Thousand Deaths" is a short story by American writer Orson Scott Card. It appears in his short story collections Capitol and Maps in a Mirror.  Card first published it in the December 1978 issue of Omni magazine.

Plot summary
In a future where the USSR has occupied America, playwright Jerry Crove is found guilty of knowing about the planned assassination of a Russian high official and not reporting it to the authorities. After he is convicted of this crime in court Jerry is supposed to confess and apologize on TV.

Instead of confessing Jerry gives a speech on freedom in America. As a result he is sentenced to be put to death, but the authorities bring him back to life.  The resurrected Crove is actually a new body, but one that was implanted with all of the real Crove's memories, including the sensations he felt while he was being executed. Threatened with being executed again, Crove is given another chance to apologize.  He does so but audience surveys show that almost no one believes that he is sincere, so he is executed again, and once more a new Crove is created, again, with all of Crove's memories, including now two executions. He is told he must persuade the nation of the sincerity of his apology, but he repeatedly fails, and is repeatedly executed by increasingly horrific means, including being boiled in oil.  Each new incarnation of Crove remember the sensation of all the previous executions.

In time, Crove becomes inured to the executions, and the Russians realize that his continued executions are only undermining their position.  Eventually they are forced to give up and exile him to another planet with the other unrepentant. He realizes they are grouping the worst of the worst, and this will eventually be their downfall.

Connection to the Worthing Saga
The story is a very early (in story timeline) prequel to The Worthing Saga. It includes some of the key technology used in The Worthing Saga, such as the sleeping drug Somec and the taping of memories. It takes place on Earth shortly after the events in the story "A Sleep and a Forgetting".  In the story "And What Will We Do Tomorrow?" it is learned from Jerry Crove’s granddaughter that he founded the planet Crove, which was renamed Capitol in the story "Skipping Stones".

See also

List of works by Orson Scott Card
Orson Scott Card

External links
 The official Orson Scott Card website

Short stories by Orson Scott Card
Works originally published in Omni (magazine)
1978 short stories